The Shark Alliance was a global not-for-profit coalition founded in 2006 by Pew Charitable Trusts of non-governmental organizations dedicated to restoring and conserving shark populations by improving shark conservation policies. 
 
The mission of the Shark Alliance is to secure the following:
Shark fishing limits in line with scientific advice and the precautionary approach, including stronger policies to prevent shark finning
Safeguards and conservation guidance for sharks through the Convention on International Trade in Endangered Species (CITES)
A United Nations Resolution that includes ambitious timelines for implementation of the International Plan of Action for Sharks and lays out consequences for inaction

The Shark Alliance was initiated and is coordinated by the Pew Environment Group, the conservation arm of Pew Charitable Trusts, a non-government organization that is working to end overfishing in the world's oceans.

The Shark Alliance concluded operations after the European Union established regulations to reduce shark finning and protect shark populations.

Shark Week
To raise public awareness about the dramatic decline of shark species and Europe's role in the process, the Shark Alliance proclaimed 8–14 October 2007 to be the first European Shark Week. Using the slogan "Every Fin Counts!", members of the public were asked to take part in events and sign a petition asking the fisheries commission of the EU for better regulation to protect sharks. During European Shark Week over 100 events were organised around Europe by Shark Alliance members. At the end of the campaign, over 20,000 signatures were presented to the fisheries commission.

In 2010, the Shark Alliance's Shark Week expanded beyond Europe to include North and South America to raise public awareness around the globe.

Member Groups
As of May 2010 the Shark Alliance consists of 85 NGOs from over 35 different countries:

ADNG Diving (Portugal) 
AIDA (Argentina, Canada, Chile, Costa Rica, Ecuador, Mexico, Peru, USA) 
AILERONS (France) 
APECE (Portugal) 
Archipelagos, Institute of Marine and Environmental Research of the Aegean Sea (Greece) 
Bloom (France) 
Canadian Shark Conservation Society (Canada) 
Chelonia Polynesia (French Polynesia) 
Conservation International 
Coral Reef Care (The Netherlands)
CRAM Foundation (Spain)
CTS (Italy)
Deepwave (Germany)
Deutsche Elasmobranchier Gesellschaft e.V. (DEG) (Germany)
Deutsche Umwelthilfe e.V. (DUH) (Germany) 
Eco-Sys Action Foundation (France, Hong Kong, Kenya) 
Ecologistas en Acción (Spain) 
European Elasmobranch Association (Europe) 
Eyes on the Horizon (EOTH) (Mozambique) 
Fédération Française d’Etudes et de Sports Sous-Marine (FFESSM) (France)
Fish4divers (UK) 
Fondazione Cetacea (Italy)
Foundation for the Protection of Marine Megafauna (FPMM) (Mozambique) 
Friends of the Earth Europe 
Gesellschaft zum Schutz der Meeressäugetiere (GSM) (Germany)
GRIS (Italy) 
Groninger Biologen Duikvereniging Calamari (The Netherlands)
Hong Kong Shark Foundation (Hong Kong) 
Humane Society International 
Iberian Biodiversity (IBBIO) (Spain) 
Iemanya Oceanica (Mexico, USA) 
Kenna Diving SL (Spain) 
Legambiente (Italy) 
Ligue Roc (France) 
Living Ocean Productions (USA) 
Longitude 181 Nature (France)
Maldives Whale Shark Research Programme (Maldives) 
Marevivo (Italy)
Marine Dimensions (Ireland) 
MarViva (Costa Rica, Panama, Colombia)
MedSharks (Italy) 
Megaptera (France) 
Nature Trust (Malta) 
Noé Conservation (France, Guinea-Bissau) 
Ocean Conservancy (USA)
Ocean Geographic (Australia)
OceanCare (Switzerland) 
Oceania Diving World (Mundoceania) (Spain) 
Pacific Environment (China, Russia, USA) 
PADI International 
Palau Shark Sanctuary (Palau) 
The Pew Charitable Trusts (USA) 
Pretoma (Costa Rica, Central America) 
Pro Wildlife e.V. (Germany) 
Project AWARE Foundation (International) 
Protect the Sharks Foundation (The Netherlands) 
Quercus (Portugal) 
Reef Check (Germany) 
Save Our Seas Foundation (International) 
Scubazoo Images (Malaysia) 
Seas at Risk (Europe) 
Shark Conservation Society (UK) 
Shark Foundation (Switzerland) 
Shark Rescue (Hong Kong) 
Shark Research Institute (Australia, Canada, Ecuador, Honduras, India, Mexico, Mozambique, Seychelles, South Africa, UK, USA)
Shark Savers (International) 
Shark Trust (UK) 
Sharklab (Malta) 
Sharklife (South Africa) 
Sharkman's World Organisation (Malta) 
Slow Food International 
SOS Grand Blanc (France) 
South African Shark Conservancy (SASC) 
Stichting de Nordzee (North Sea Foundation) (The Netherlands) 
SUBMON (Spain)
Swedish Elasmobranch Society (SES) (Sweden) 
"Tethys" Hellenic Association of Recreational Scubadivers (Greece)
Tethys Research Institute (Italy) 
UK Shark Tagging Programme 
Utila Whale Shark Research (Honduras) 
VDST - Verband Deutscher Sporttaucher (Germany) 
Vivamar (Slovenia) 
White Shark Ecoventures (South Africa) 
WildAid (International) 
Wildcoast/Costasalvaje (Mexico, USA)

References

External links
European Elasmobranch Association
Pew Environment Group
Project AWARE Foundation
Shark Trust
Alliance member groups

Shark conservation
International environmental organizations
Fisheries conservation organizations